In eight-dimensional geometry, a runcinated 8-simplex is a convex uniform 8-polytope with 3rd order truncations (runcination) of the regular 8-simplex. 

There are eleven unique runcinations of the 8-simplex, including permutations of truncation and cantellation. The triruncinated 8-simplex and triruncicantitruncated 8-simplex have a doubled symmetry, showing [18] order reflectional symmetry in the A8 Coxeter plane.

Runcinated 8-simplex

Alternate names 
 Runcinated enneazetton 
 Small prismated enneazetton (Acronym: spene) (Jonathan Bowers)

Coordinates 

The Cartesian coordinates of the vertices of the runcinated 8-simplex can be most simply positioned in 9-space as permutations of (0,0,0,0,0,1,1,1,2). This construction is based on facets of the runcinated 9-orthoplex.

Images

Biruncinated 8-simplex

Alternate names 
 Biruncinated enneazetton 
 Small biprismated enneazetton (Acronym: sabpene) (Jonathan Bowers)

Coordinates 
The Cartesian coordinates of the vertices of the biruncinated 8-simplex can be most simply positioned in 9-space as permutations of (0,0,0,0,1,1,1,2,2). This construction is based on facets of the biruncinated 9-orthoplex.

Images

Triruncinated 8-simplex

Alternate names 
 Triruncinated enneazetton 
 Small triprismated enneazetton (Acronym: satpeb) (Jonathan Bowers)

Coordinates 
The Cartesian coordinates of the vertices of the triruncinated 8-simplex can be most simply positioned in 9-space as permutations of (0,0,0,1,1,1,2,2,2). This construction is based on facets of the triruncinated 9-orthoplex.

Images

Runcitruncated 8-simplex

Images

Biruncitruncated 8-simplex

Images

Triruncitruncated 8-simplex

Images

Runcicantellated 8-simplex

Images

Biruncicantellated 8-simplex

Images

Runcicantitruncated 8-simplex

Images

Biruncicantitruncated 8-simplex

Images

Triruncicantitruncated 8-simplex

Images

Related polytopes 

This polytope is one of 135 uniform 8-polytopes with A8 symmetry.

Notes

References
 H.S.M. Coxeter: 
 H.S.M. Coxeter, Regular Polytopes, 3rd Edition, Dover New York, 1973 
 Kaleidoscopes: Selected Writings of H.S.M. Coxeter, edited by F. Arthur Sherk, Peter McMullen, Anthony C. Thompson, Asia Ivic Weiss, Wiley-Interscience Publication, 1995,  
 (Paper 22) H.S.M. Coxeter, Regular and Semi Regular Polytopes I, [Math. Zeit. 46 (1940) 380-407, MR 2,10]
 (Paper 23) H.S.M. Coxeter, Regular and Semi-Regular Polytopes II, [Math. Zeit. 188 (1985) 559-591]
 (Paper 24) H.S.M. Coxeter, Regular and Semi-Regular Polytopes III, [Math. Zeit. 200 (1988) 3-45]
 Norman Johnson Uniform Polytopes, Manuscript (1991)
 N.W. Johnson: The Theory of Uniform Polytopes and Honeycombs, Ph.D. 
  x3o3o3x3o3o3o3o - spene, o3x3o3o3x3o3o3o - sabpene, o3o3x3o3o3x3o3o - satpeb

External links 
 Polytopes of Various Dimensions
 Multi-dimensional Glossary

8-polytopes